The Cap of the North ( in Norwegian and Swedish, or  in Finnish) is the regions of Norway, Sweden, and Finland located north of the arctic circle. It usually consists of the counties Troms og Finnmark and Nordland in Norway, Norrbotten in Sweden, and Lapland in Finland. The region has a subarctic climate and is home to the majority of the Sámi people.

The region contains over 30% of the total area of the three countries, but it houses less than 5% of their population.

The Kola Peninsula was considered a part of this region until 1917, but this was changed after the Russian Revolution, with the new Soviet Union closing their borders.

Sámi historian Per Guttorm Kvenangen has criticized the term  for displacing the overlapping term Sápmi and hiding the "Sámi character" of northern Fennoscandia.

References

Geography of Northern Europe
Geography of Eastern Europe
Geography of Nordland
Geography of Troms og Finnmark
Geography of Murmansk Oblast
Geography of Sweden
Geography of Finland